Costicoma is a genus of moths in the family Geometridae. It consists of only one species, Costicoma exangulata, which is found in northern India.

References

	

Cidariini
Monotypic moth genera
Moths of Asia